Paralaoma morti, also known as Mort's pinhead snail, is a species of land snail that is found on Australia's Lord Howe Island in the Tasman Sea.

Taxonomy
This species is sometimes considered to be a synonym of P. caputspinulae or of P. servilis.

Description
The depressedly turbinate shell of the mature snail is 1.1–1.3 mm in height, with a diameter of 1.7–2.4 mm, and a low spire. It is golden-brown in colour. The whorls are rounded and slightly shouldered, with impressed sutures and distinct, widely spaced radial ribs. It has a roundedly lunate aperture and widely open umbilicus.

Distribution and habitat
The snail is common and widespread across the island.

References

 

 
morti
Gastropods of Lord Howe Island
Taxa named by James Charles Cox
Gastropods described in 1864